Pierre Gauvreau (23 August 19227 April 2011) was a Québécois painter and writer who also worked in film and television production.

Career
He was born in Montreal, and enrolled at the École des Beaux-Arts de Montréal in 1937, today part of UQAM. He became a member of the Contemporary Art Society in 1939. Gauvreau served overseas with the Canadian Army and on his return to Montreal, went back to the École des Beaux-Arts for two more years of study. He was associated with Quebec artistic dissident group Les Automatistes, showing his work in the first Automatist exhibition in Canada in 1946. The second Automatist show took place in his mother`s apartment, the home he shared with his brother, Claude Gauvreau, a writer, and it was at this exhibition that the group was first referred to as the Automatistes. He became a signatory to the Refus global manifesto, which he typed and printed in his apartment. The publication contained reproductions of his recent paintings.

Gauvreau worked in various aspects of television production during the 1950s. He was best known in French-Canada for his popular series, Temps d'une paix. During a stint at the National Film Board, he also produced Claude Jutra's 1971 classic, Mon Oncle Antoine. He took a break from painting during the 1960s until 1975. In the 1990s he began experimenting with new techniques, including spray paint. He continued to paint in 2005, true to his Automatist beginnings. His work has been described as gestural and calligraphic and his later work as looking lace-like. Selected collections include the National Gallery of Canada, Ottawa; the Montreal Museum of Fine Arts; the Musée national des beaux-arts du Québec, Québec; and many other galleries, including the Robert McLaughlin Gallery, Oshawa.

Gauvreau's career was the subject of a Charles Binamé documentary, l'obligation de la liberté, and a biography. One of his works, The Bottom of the Closet, was reproduced on a 45-cent postage stamp in 1998 for a set of seven stamps for the Automatistes.

Gauvreau died on 7 April 2011 of heart failure at the age of 88.

Awards and recognition
1990: Prix Gemeaux, Grand Prix for his film and television work
1995: le Prix Louis-Philippe-Hébert

See also
 Claude Gauvreau
 Pierre Henry (painter)

References

Bibliography

External links
 
  Fonds Pierre Gauvreau (R1318) at Library and Archives Canada

1922 births
2011 deaths
20th-century Canadian painters
Canadian male painters
21st-century Canadian painters
Artists from Montreal
École des beaux-arts de Montréal alumni
20th-century Canadian male artists
21st-century Canadian male artists
Canadian abstract artists